Olios ceylonicus is a species of spider of the genus Olios. It is endemic to Sri Lanka. It is part of the huntsman spider family Sparassidae.

See also 
 List of Sparassidae species

References

Sparassidae
Endemic fauna of Sri Lanka
Spiders of Asia
Spiders described in 1902